Moses Archuleta is an American drummer and multi-instrumentalist. He is best known as the drummer, occasional keyboardist and co-founder of the indie rock band Deerhunter, with whom he has recorded seven studio albums.

Archuleta also records solo material under the name Moon Diagrams, releasing an EP, Care Package, in 2015.

He announced his debut album as Moon Diagrams called Lifetime Of Love on May 4, 2017, and it was co-released on June 30, 2017 by Geographic North and Sonic Cathedral Records.

Personal life
Archuleta is of Korean and Hispanic descent. Regarding his upbringing he states, "I was an army brat, so I grew up all over the place. Never in the city, always small towns and suburbs."

From 2005 to 2007, Archuleta worked in an American Apparel store as a Back Stock Manager. Prior to this, he worked in a "vintage clothing store".

Discography
with Deerhunter

Turn It Up Faggot (2005)
Cryptograms (2007)
Microcastle (2008)
Weird Era Cont. (2008)
Halcyon Digest (2010)
Monomania (2013)
Fading Frontier (2015)
Why Hasn't Everything Already Disappeared? (2019)

as Moon Diagrams
Care Package EP (2015)
 Lifetime of Love (2017)

References

Living people
American drummers
American keyboardists
American rock musicians
American musicians of Korean descent
Hispanic and Latino American musicians
Year of birth missing (living people)
Deerhunter members